Istor-o-Nal is the third highest mountain in the Hindu Kush, in the Chitral District of the North-West Frontier Province of Pakistan. It is the 68th highest independent peak in the world. The peak is located a few kilometres northeast of Tirich Mir (the highest mountain in the Hindu Kush), across the Tirich Glacier. Because Istor-o-Nal is behind the higher peak of Tirich Mir from many viewpoints, it is not easily visible and therefore not well known.

The word "Istoro Nal" means horseshoe in the chitrali language (Istor means "horse"). The origin of the name is unclear.

Istor-o-Nal was first climbed on June 8, 1955, by the Americans Joseph E. Murphy, Jr., and Thomas A. Mutch, led by Pakistani Major Ken Bankwala, on a Princeton Mountaineering Club expedition. They climbed the west ridge, starting from the south side of the peak on the Tirich Glacier. Their small, minimally financed expedition (by the standards of the time for high-altitude mountaineering) achieved what was then the second highest summit attained by Americans.

See also
 List of mountains in Pakistan
 List of highest mountains

References

External links
 Expedition Istoro Nal
 Terichmir, Highest Peak in Hindukush
 Unclimbed 7000m Peaks

Hindu Kush
Mountains of Khyber Pakhtunkhwa
Mountains of Pakistan
Mountains of the Hindu Kush
Seven-thousanders of the Hindu Kush